Michael Schumacher Racing World Kart 2002 is a racing video game released for PlayStation and Microsoft Windows in 2002, developed by Radon Labs and published by JoWooD Productions.

Reception
IGN gave the Windows version of Michael Schumacher Racing World Kart 2002 a decent 7.0 out of 10 overall despite little criticism saying "There were reports of problems with installation and setup of the game, but it ran fine on the system" they praised the presentation of the game stating "It is easy to use menus and a straight forward manual will help players get in with little fuss".

References

External links
 Michael Schumacher Racing World Kart 2002 at GameSpot
 

2002 video games
Schumacher
Schumacher
JoWooD Entertainment games
Kart racing video games
Michael Schumacher
Multiplayer and single-player video games
PlayStation (console) games
Racing video games
Radon Labs games
Video games based on real people
Video games developed in Germany
Windows games